Algernon Capell, 2nd Earl of Essex  PC (28 December 1670 – 10 January 1710, Watford) of Cassiobury House, Watford, Hertfordshire, was an English nobleman, a soldier and courtier.

Origins
He was the son of Arthur Capell, 1st Earl of Essex (1631–1683) by his wife Elizabeth Percy, a daughter of Algernon Percy, 10th Earl of Northumberland.

Career
After his father's suicide in 1683, Capell became the 2nd Earl of Essex. He held the office of Gentleman of the Bedchamber to King William III between 1691 and 1702. As Lord Lieutenant of Hertfordshire he was Colonel of the Hertfordshire Militia in 1697. He was Colonel of the 4th Dragoons between 1693 and 1710. In 1708 was made a Privy Counsellor by Queen Anne.

Marriage and children

On 28 February 1698 Algernon Capell married Mary Bentinck, a daughter of William Bentinck, 1st Earl of Portland by his wife Anne Villiers, by whom he had three children:

 William Capell, 3rd Earl of Essex (1697–1743), son and heir, who married twice.
Firstly to Lady Jane Hyde (died January 1723/24), daughter of  Henry Hyde, 4th Earl of Clarendon, by whom he had two daughters.
Secondly to Lady Elizabeth Russell (died 8 June 1784), a daughter of Wriothesley Russell, 2nd Duke of Bedford, by whom he had children including William Capell, 4th Earl of Essex.
 Lady Mary Capel (died 12 November 1762), wife of Alan Brodrick, 2nd Viscount Midleton (died 8 June 1747), with issue.
 Lady Elizabeth Capell, who married twice:
Firstly to Samuel Molyneux, without issue.
Secondly to Nathaniel St. André, without issue.

References

External links
 Algernon Capell, 2nd Earl of Essex
 Crofts Peerage Earls of Essex

1654 births
1710 deaths
17th-century English nobility
18th-century English people
4th Queen's Own Hussars officers
Lord-Lieutenants of Hertfordshire
Lord-Lieutenants of the Tower Hamlets
Members of the Privy Council of Great Britain
Algernon
Algernon
Essex